Silicon Valley International School Willows Campus known colloquially as Silco, Alto, or Willows' Campus, as well as Alto International School, is the high school of Silicon Valley International School.  The campus is located in Menlo Park, California, in the San Francisco Bay Area, and offers preparatory, multilingual, progressive education, immersion language programs in French, German, and Chinese for preschool and high school.

As an International Baccalaureate (IB) World School since 2007, the school offers both the IB Middle Years Programme (MYP) from Grades 6 through Grade 10, and (Since receiving accreditation in 2018) the IB Diploma Programme (DP) from Grades 11 and 12. The school also used to offer the Deutsches Sprachdiplom Stufe I and II, which entitles foreign students to apply for university entry in Germany, but abandoned it following the merger with Silicon Valley International School.

The school was originally founded in 1988 as the first German school on the US West Coast and changed its name from German-American International School (GAIS) to Alto International School in September of 2016.  it had 250 students. In August 2018, Alto launched a partnership with Stiftung Louisenlund near Kiel, Germany, to develop joined student programs. Since Summer of 2019, Alto was part of the Round Square network of international schools, but this association was abandoned with the merger of Silicon Valley International School. 

In August of 2021, Alto merged with Silicon Valley International School and the school changed its name from Alto International School to the Willows' Campus of Silicon Valley International School.

Academic achievements 
Based on the International Schools' Assessment (ISA) and the PISA test of the Organization for Economic Cooperation and Development (OECD), Alto students used to consistently outperform comparable schools worldwide and in 2017 Alto's 9th Grade students had tested above the highest ranking schools systems in the world and scored in the top 10% worldwide. In addition, according to the Presidential Honor Roll of the American Association of Teachers of German, students of Alto International School ranked in 2017 and 2018 within the top 3 schools in California and within the top 10 schools nationwide.

Rewards 
In 2017, 2018, and 2019, the "Best of the Best" edition of the Bay Area Magazine, Alto International School was awarded Gold and Silver medals for the best school in the following 6 categories: Preschool, Elementary School, Middle School, High School, International School and Language Immersion Program.

References

External links
 Silicon Valley International School
 

High schools in San Mateo County, California
International Baccalaureate schools in California
Private K-12 schools in California
German international schools in the United States
International schools in California
International schools in San Francisco
1988 establishments in California
Educational institutions established in 1988
German-American culture in California
Round Square schools